Kitakami Michinoku Traditional Dance Festival is a summer festival held in Kitakami, Iwate, Japan, where Devils Sword (鬼剣舞), Deer (鹿踊), Tiger and other traditional dances of Michinoku, Japan's northeast region, are performed. A recent program of this festival included: Bon dance on the first day, the parade of the traditional dances on the second, and the Fireworks display over the Kitakami River on the third day.

See also
 Festivals of Japan
 List of festivals in Japan

References

External links
 Kitakami Michinoku Traditional Dance Festival

Festivals in Japan
Ritual animal disguise
Culture in Iwate Prefecture
Tourist attractions in Iwate Prefecture
Fireworks events in Asia
Dance festivals in Japan
Summer events in Japan